Aston Martin is a British car manufacturer that has participated in Formula One in various forms. The company first participated in Formula One during the 1959 season where they debuted the DBR4 chassis using their own engine but it failed to score any points. They continued to perform poorly through the 1960 season, once again failing to score any points. As a result, Aston Martin decided to leave Formula One after 1960.

The team, owned by Lawrence Stroll, has Fernando Alonso and Lance Stroll as their race drivers beginning with the 2023 season. The team is headquartered in Silverstone.

History

David Brown Corporation (1959–1960) 

Aston Martin first entered Formula One with the DBR4, their first open-wheel racing car. The DBR4 was first built and tested in 1957 but did not make its Formula One debut until 1959. This delay was caused by the company prioritising the development of the DBR1 sports car, which went on to win the 1959 24 Hours of Le Mans. By the DBR4's world championship debut at the Dutch Grand Prix, it had become outdated and struggled for pace against its competitors, with Carroll Shelby and Roy Salvadori qualifying 10th and 13th respectively out of 15. Salvadori retired from the race in the early laps with an engine failure, with Shelby's car suffering the same fate later in the race.

The team's next entry came at the British Grand Prix where Salvadori surprised by qualifying in 2nd place. Early in the race, one of Shelby's ignition magnetos failed, harming his car's pace. The second magneto failed late in the race, causing his retirement. Salvadori could only hold on to 6th place, narrowly missing out on a points finish. At the Portuguese Grand Prix, both cars avoided issues to finish 6th and 8th but still failed to score points. Aston Martin's final entry of the season was the Italian Grand Prix where both cars continued to struggle, qualifying only 17th and 19th. During the race, Salvadori had run as high as 7th before suffering an engine failure whilst Shelby came home to finish 10th. The car was significantly outdated by its rivals and failed to score any points.

Aston Martin built the DBR5 to compete in the 1960 season. The DBR5 was based on its predecessor but was lighter and featured an independent suspension. However, the car had a heavy engine in the front and was regularly outclassed by the more commonplace rear-engined cars. The team's first entry of the season came at the Dutch Grand Prix, but the DBR5 was not yet ready to compete. As a result, only Salvadori entered the race, driving the spare DBR4. He could only qualify 18th. Despite being allowed to start the race, Aston Martin were told by the race organisers that they would not be paid. The team, therefore, refused to start the race. The DBR5s were ready for the team's next race in Britain, with Salvadori and Maurice Trintignant taking part. Salvadori retired from the race with steering problems, and Trintignant could only finish 11th, five laps behind the leader.

Following this string of poor results, with the team failing to score a single championship point, Aston Martin abandoned Formula One entirely after the British Grand Prix to focus on sports car racing.

Potential return and sponsorship (2008, 2010, 2016–2020) 

In 2006, David Richards, who leads the consortium that owns Aston Martin, and his tech firm Prodrive were granted a spot as a potential entrant for the 2008 Formula One World Championship. Upon speculation of an Aston Martin F1 return, Richards made it clear that Aston Martin had a long way to go until it was ready for an F1 team. He believed the route to being competitive was to partner with an existing team, rather than setting up a new team with Aston Martin and Prodrive. In 2009, Richards again announced his intent to return to Formula One in 2010 with the possibility of using the Aston Martin name, however, this did not come to fruition. Between 2016 and 2020 Aston Martin served as a sponsor for Red Bull Racing, and as title sponsor of the team between 2018 and 2020.

Aston Martin F1 Team (2021–present)

In January 2020, a funding investment from Racing Point owner Lawrence Stroll into Aston Martin saw him take a 16.7% stake in the company. This resulted in the commercial rebranding of Racing Point UK's Racing Point F1 Team into Aston Martin F1 Team for the 2021 season. The team competes with Mercedes power units, which it has done under its various names since 2009. Sergio Pérez was under contract to drive for them until 2022, but he was replaced by four-time World Drivers' Champion Sebastian Vettel, who previously drove at Ferrari, for the 2021 championship. The team had also signed Nico Hülkenberg as their reserve and development driver.

As part of the rebrand, the team switched their racing colour of BWT pink to a modern iteration of Aston Martin's British racing green. Cognizant was also announced as the team's new title sponsor in January 2021. The Aston Martin AMR21 was unveiled in March 2021 and became Aston Martin's first Formula One car after a 61-year absence from the sport.

Aston Martin have a new  factory set to be operational by 2023 at their Silverstone base. The factory features three interconnected buildings and is based in a 40-acre site directly opposite the Silverstone circuit. Building One will serve as the main building housing the team's design, manufacturing, and marketing resources. Building Two will redevelop and repurpose the original factory premises as a central hub with staff amenities and will also serve as a logistics centre. Building Two is set to house the team's wellness centre, auditorium, simulator and heritage facility, while Building Three will contain the new wind tunnel. Aston Martin is the sixth different constructor to operate from the Silverstone base since 1991.

Vettel earned Aston Martin's first podium by finishing second in the Azerbaijan Grand Prix. Vettel finished second again in the Hungarian Grand Prix, but was disqualified due to a fuel sample issue. In June 2021, Team Principal Otmar Szafnauer confirmed that the team will expand its workforce from 535 to 800 employees. In September 2021, Aston Martin confirmed they would compete in 2022 with an unchanged driver lineup. In January 2022, Team Principal Otmar Szafnauer left after having spent 12 years with the team. Mike Krack, who had previously worked on BMW and Porsche motorsport teams, was announced as his replacement in the same month. In February 2022, Aramco was announced as the team's joint title sponsor after having secured a long-term partnership deal.

Vettel missed the opening two races of 2022 after testing positive for COVID-19. He returned on the third race of the season at the 2022 Australian Grand Prix. Vettel retired following the conclusion of the 2022 season. Stoffel Vandoorne joined the team as their new test and reserve driver, a role he shares with Felipe Drugovich. Hülkenberg left Aston Martin, returning as a full-time F1 driver for the Haas F1 Team in 2023.

Formula One World Championship results

David Brown Corporation (1959–1960) 
(key)

Aston Martin F1 Team (2021–present) 
(key)

Notes
  – Driver did not finish the Grand Prix but was classified as they completed over 90% of the race distance.
  – Half points awarded as less than 75% of the race distance was completed.
 * – Season still in progress.

David Brown Corporation - Non-championship Formula One results (1959–1960)
(key)

Driver development programme 

In September 2022, Aston Martin announced that they have established their own junior racing driver academy starting with the 2023 season to scout new talent for the team, with 2022 Formula 2 Champion Felipe Drugovich becoming the first member of the AMF1 Driver Development Programme.

Current drivers

References

External links 
 

Aston Martin in Formula One
Formula One entrants
1959 establishments in England
1960 disestablishments in England
2021 establishments in England
Auto racing teams established in 1959
Auto racing teams disestablished in 1960
Auto racing teams established in 2021
Formula One engine manufacturers